Nephele peneus is a moth of the family Sphingidae. It is known from forests and woodland from Senegal to East Africa, Angola and Delagoa Bay.

References

Nephele (moth)
Moths of Africa
Lepidoptera of Angola
Lepidoptera of Cameroon
Insects of the Central African Republic
Lepidoptera of the Democratic Republic of the Congo
Lepidoptera of Ethiopia
Lepidoptera of Gabon
Fauna of the Gambia
Lepidoptera of Mozambique
Lepidoptera of West Africa
Moths described in 1776
Taxa named by Pieter Cramer